Joseph Cox (1697–1753) was High Sheriff of Berkshire.

Biography
Joseph was the son of Joseph Cox of Cox's Hall, Stanford-in-the-Vale, he was educated at John Roysse's Free School in Abingdon, (now Abingdon School) c.1707. He received his later education at Christ Church, Oxford.

On 12 January 1738, he was appointed High Sheriff of Berkshire. In 1690 the Cox family built the grand house of the village, Cox's Hall and its adjacent Dovecote and also presented a silver flagon to the Church for their thanks to Almighty God, for the recovery of their three children from smallpox.

See also
 List of Old Abingdonians

References

1697 births
1753 deaths
High Sheriffs of Berkshire
People educated at Abingdon School
People from Vale of White Horse (district)